Harriet Jane Carrick Moore (1801 – 6 March 1884) was a British watercolour artist who is best known for her drawings of Michael Faraday's work at the Royal Institution. She documented his apartment, study, and laboratory in a series of watercolour paintings  in the early 1850s. Letters between Faraday and Moore survive at the Institution of Engineering and Technology.
She, and her family, were close with the Swiss-born artist Henry Fuseli.

She was the eldest of the five children of James Carrick Moore (1762–1840) and Harriet  Henderson (1779–1866). She was the niece of  Sir John Moore, a British army general in the Peninsular war.

Gallery

References

External links

Harriet Jane Moore gallery at artchive.com Accessed February 2010.

1801 births
1884 deaths
Artists from London
British watercolourists
Date of birth missing
Place of birth missing
Place of death missing